Qaleh-ye Mirzai or Qaleh Mirzai may refer to:
 Qaleh-ye Mirzai, Kavar
 Qaleh-ye Mirzai, Kazerun

See also
 Qaleh-ye Mirza